The  is a constituency that represents Yamanashi Prefecture in the House of Councillors in the Diet of Japan. It has two Councillors in the 242-member house.

Outline
The constituency represents the entire population of Yamanashi Prefecture. The district elects two Councillors to six-year terms, one at alternating elections held every three years. The district has 692,001 registered voters as of September 2015. The Councillors currently representing Yamanashi are:
 Azuma Koshiishi (Democratic Party, third term; term ends in 2016.)
 Hiroshi Moriya (Liberal Democratic Party, first term; term ends in 2019)

Elected councillors

Election results

See also
List of districts of the House of Councillors of Japan

References 

Districts of the House of Councillors (Japan)